Bringalbert is a locality in the western part of the Wimmera region of Victoria, Australia.

References

Towns in Victoria (Australia)